This is a list of the wool, cotton and other textile mills in Leeds, West Yorkshire.

Adel Cum Eccup (Leeds)

Esholt (Aireborough)

Hawksworth (Aireborough)

Armley (Leeds)

Beeston (Leeds)

Bramley (Leeds)

Calverley With Farsley (Pudsey)

Farnley (Leeds)

Guiseley

Headingley Cum Burley (Leeds)

Holbeck (Leeds)

Hunslet (Leeds)

Leeds

Morley

Otley (Aireborough; Otley)

Potter Newton (Leeds)

Pudsey

Rawdon (Aireborough)

Wortley (Leeds)

Yeadon (Aireborough)

References

Footnotes

The National Monument Record is a legacy numbering system maintained by English Heritage. Further details on each mill may be obtained from http://yorkshire.u08.eu/

Notes

Bibliography

External links
 

Buildings and structures in Leeds
Leeds
Leeds
Leeds
Leeds
History of Leeds
History of the textile industry in the United Kingdom
Industrial Revolution in England